John Michael Van Liew (December 12, 1881 – December 7, 1959) was an American football and basketball coach. He served as the head football coach at Knox College in Galesburg, Illinois from 1923 to 1926, at Western State College of Colorado—now known as Western Colorado University—in 1927, at North Carolina State University in 1930, and at Hanover College from 1932 to 1942, compiling a career college football record of 57–77–3. Van Liew was also the head basketball coach at Knox from 1923 to 1926 and Hanover from 1932 to 1942, tallying a career college basketball mark of 100–104.  Van Liew was a graduate of Grinnell College.

Head coaching record

Football

References

External links
 

1881 births
1959 deaths
Basketball coaches from Iowa
Hanover Panthers athletic directors
Hanover Panthers football coaches
Hanover Panthers men's basketball coaches
Knox Prairie Fire football coaches
Knox Prairie Fire men's basketball coaches
NC State Wolfpack football coaches
Western Colorado Mountaineers football coaches
Grinnell College alumni
People from Ottumwa, Iowa
People from Mooresville, Indiana